Edward Berkeley may refer to:
Edward Berkeley (died 1707) (ca. 1644 – 1707), MP for Wells
Edward Berkeley (died 1596), MP for Old Sarum

See also
Edward Barclay (disambiguation)